Wat Nang Phaya is a Buddhist temple in Phitsanulok, Thailand.

Geography
Wat Nang Phaya is located on the eastern bank of the Nan River.  Wat Nang Phaya links to the campus of Wat Ratchaburana.

History
Wat Nang Phaya is said to have been built when Phitsanulok was ruled by King Trailokanat (1448-1488).

Features
Wat Nang Phraya has no temple, but it is known for its Phrara Nang Phya, which are votive tablets found within the pagoda's repository.

Nang Phaya